In mathematics, specifically category theory, a posetal category, or thin category, is a category whose homsets each contain at most one morphism. As such, a posetal category amounts to a preordered class (or a preordered set, if its objects form a set). As suggested by the name, the further requirement that the category be skeletal is often assumed for the definition of "posetal"; in the case of a category that is posetal, being skeletal is equivalent to the requirement that the only isomorphisms are the identity morphisms, equivalently that the preordered class satisfies antisymmetry and hence, if a set, is a poset.

All diagrams commute in a posetal category. When the commutative diagrams of a category are interpreted as a typed equational theory whose objects are the types, a codiscrete posetal category corresponds to an inconsistent theory understood as one satisfying the axiom x = y at all types.

Viewing a 2-category as an enriched category whose hom-objects are categories, the hom-objects of any extension of a posetal category to a 2-category having the same 1-cells are monoids.

Some lattice-theoretic structures are definable as posetal categories of a certain kind, usually with the stronger assumption of being skeletal. For example, under this assumption, a poset may be defined as a small posetal category, a distributive lattice as a small posetal distributive category, a Heyting algebra as a small posetal finitely cocomplete cartesian closed category, and a Boolean algebra as a small posetal finitely cocomplete *-autonomous category. Conversely, categories, distributive categories, finitely cocomplete cartesian closed categories, and finitely cocomplete *-autonomous categories can be considered the respective categorifications of posets, distributive lattices, Heyting algebras, and Boolean algebras.

References

Category theory